YID may refer to:

Yunnan Institute of Development
Yid